Sam Lammers (born 30 April 1997) is a Dutch professional footballer who plays as a striker for  club Sampdoria, on loan from Atalanta.

Club career
Before Lammers signed for PSV in 2010, he played for Willem II and VOAB, a local football club from Goirle. His debut in paid football was on 10 August 2015, when he faced Go Ahead Eagles with Jong PSV. On 8 August 2016, he scored a hat-trick in Jong PSV's 5–4 win against Den Bosch.

Lammers made his debut for PSV Eindhoven on 21 September in a cup match against Roda.

In September 2020, Lammers joined Serie A club Atalanta. The transfer fee paid to PSV was reported as €9 million plus €2 million in possible bonuses. On 4 October, he scored his first goal in a 5–2 win against Cagliari.

In September 2021, Lammers joined Eintracht Frankfurt on loan for a season, without option to buy, to replace André Silva who left Eintracht for RB Leipzig.

On 7 August 2022, Lammers joined Serie A club Empoli on a season-long loan. In January 2023, this loan was terminated and Lammers joined Sampdoria on loan until the end of the season.

Career statistics

Club

Honours
PSV
 Eredivisie: 2017–18

Eintracht Frankfurt
UEFA Europa League: 2021–22

Individual
Eredivisie Talent of the Month: January 2019

References

External links

 
 Sam Lammers page at official PSV site

Living people
1997 births
Footballers from Tilburg
Association football forwards
Dutch footballers
PSV Eindhoven players
Jong PSV players
SC Heerenveen players
Atalanta B.C. players
Eintracht Frankfurt players
Empoli F.C. players
U.C. Sampdoria players
Eredivisie players
Eerste Divisie players
Serie A players
UEFA Europa League winning players
Dutch expatriate footballers
Dutch expatriate sportspeople in Italy
Expatriate footballers in Italy
Dutch expatriate sportspeople in Germany
Expatriate footballers in Germany